Charade Quiz was an American game show hosted by Bill Slater which aired on the DuMont Television Network Thursdays at 8:30 p.m. ET from November 27, 1947, to June 23, 1949.

Overview
In this 30-minute program, viewers requested to see something performed by panelists through charades. If the panelists failed to perform the stunt, the viewer received $15. Episodes featured "a regular slate of actors with a panel of four trying to guess what they were pantomiming."

The program originated from the Adelphi Theatre in New York.

Personnel
Bill Slater was the program's master of ceremonies. Victor Keppler was the producer, and Henry Alexander was the director. A review in the trade publication Billboard observed: "Slater's handling of the question-master's role was assured and good humored. The small troupe of youngsters who acted out the problems did an adequate job."

Charles Polacheck and Victor Keppler produced the program. Henry Alexander was the director, and Frank Bunetta was the technical director.

Beginning in July 1948, Whelan Drug Stores sponsored the program.

Reception
A review in The New York Times in March 1948 called the program "a diverting half hour", although the quality varied from week to week with different actors and different people trying to guess what was being pantomimed. Reviewer Jack Gould also felt that Slater demonstrated "a certain smugness which is not particularly appealing".

Episode status
 
Owing to DuMont's network practices, at least some episodes of Charade Quiz were held by the network until the dumping of its archive in the 1970s. No episodes are known to exist.

See also
 List of programs broadcast by the DuMont Television Network
 List of surviving DuMont Television Network broadcasts
 1947-48 United States network television schedule
 1948-49 United States network television schedule

Notes

References

Bibliography
David Weinstein, The Forgotten Network: DuMont and the Birth of American Television (Philadelphia: Temple University Press, 2004) 
Alex McNeil, Total Television, Fourth edition (New York: Penguin Books, 1980) 
Tim Brooks and Earle Marsh, The Complete Directory to Prime Time Network TV Shows, Third edition (New York: Ballantine Books, 1964)

External links
 
 DuMont historical website 
1947 American television series debuts
1949 American television series endings
1940s American game shows
DuMont Television Network original programming
Black-and-white American television shows
English-language television shows
Lost television shows